Renatus Andrieux (1742–1792) was a French Jesuit. He was one of the victims of the September Massacres.

Sources
 Blessed René-Marie Andrieux

1742 births
1792 deaths
French beatified people
18th-century French Jesuits
French clergy killed in the French Revolution